Nicolás Alejandro Rodríguez Charquero (born 22 July 1991 in Montevideo) is a Uruguayan footballer who plays for Uruguayan side Defensor Sporting.

National
He has been capped by the Uruguay national under-20 football team for the 2011 South American Youth Championship.

International goals

|-
| 1. || 25 July 2010 || Estadio Defensores del Chaco, Asunción, Paraguay ||  || 2–1 || 2–1 || Copa Integración Latinoamericana
|}

References

External links

1991 births
Living people
Footballers from Montevideo
Association football defenders
Uruguayan footballers
Uruguay under-20 international footballers
Uruguayan expatriate footballers
Uruguayan Primera División players
Montevideo Wanderers F.C. players
Club Atlético River Plate (Montevideo) players
Cerro Largo F.C. players
Plaza Colonia players
Liga I players
CSM Corona Brașov footballers
Expatriate footballers in Romania
Uruguayan expatriate sportspeople in Romania
Defensor Sporting players